Steve or Steven Ferguson may refer to:

Steven Ferguson (born 1980), New Zealand canoeist and swimmer
Steven Ferguson (footballer, born 1977), Scottish football player and coach
Steven Ferguson (footballer, born 1982), Scottish football player
Steve Ferguson (musician), member of American rock band NRBQ